Daniele Pontoni (born 8 September 1966 in Udine) is a former Italian professional cyclo-cross cyclist. Pontoni was World Champion of cyclo-cross by the amateurs in 1992 and by the elite in 1997. He was Italian cyclo-cross champion from 1996 to 2004. He also competed at the 1996 Summer Olympics.

Palmarès 

1991
Milano
Roma
1992
Igorre
Milano
Overijse
World Cyclo-cross Championship for Amateurs
Wetzikon
Zarautz
Zillebeke
1993
Harnes
Milano
Overijse
Westouter
Zarautz
Diegem
1994
Igorre
 national cyclo-cross championship
Meilen
1995
Igorre
Milano
 national cyclo-cross championship
Diegem
1996
 national cyclo-cross championship
Igorre
Diegem
1997
World Cyclo-cross Championship
Pétange
GP dell'Epifania
 national cyclo-cross championship
Solbiate Olona/Milano
Silvelle
1998
Milano
Pétange
Pontchâteau
GP dell'Epifania
 national cyclo-cross championship
Bolzano
Leudelange
Garfagnana
Kortezubi
Parabiago
1999
Pétange
Kayl
Solbiate Olona/Milano (ITA)
 national cyclo-cross championship
Pistoia
Boston supercup round 1
Milano
Bolzano
Garfagnana
2000
Pétange
GP dell'Epifania
 national cyclo-cross championship
Nommay
Milano
Igorre
2001
 national cyclo-cross championship
Lanarvily
Buttrio
Bolzano
2002
Ispaster
Milano
 national cyclo-cross championship
Lekeitio
Sassoferrato
Zegliacco
2003
 national cyclo-cross championship
Trebaseleghe
Valle Orco e Soana
Bolzano
Garfagnana
Lurago d'Erba
2004
 national cyclo-cross championship
Portland Saturn/Stumptown
Thousand Oaks
Seaford-New York
Faè di Oderzo
Soligo/Farra di Soligo
Morbegno
Garfagnana
Lurago d'Erba
Bassano del Grappa
2005
Triveneto Gara di Caonada
Vittorio Veneto
Fujimi
Yasugawa
Farra di Soligo

References

External links 

1966 births
Living people
Sportspeople from Udine
Italian male cyclists
Cyclo-cross cyclists
UCI Cyclo-cross World Champions (men)
Olympic cyclists of Italy
Cyclists at the 1996 Summer Olympics
Cyclists from Friuli Venezia Giulia